Aechmea spectabilis is a plant species in the genus Aechmea. This species is native to Venezuela and Colombia.

Cultivars
 Aechmea 'Lilac Cloud'

References

spectabilis
Flora of Venezuela
Plants described in 1860
Flora of Colombia